Laban Wheaton (March 13, 1754 – March 23, 1846) was a U.S. Representative from Massachusetts.

Early life and education
Born in Mansfield in the Province of Massachusetts Bay, Wheaton attended Wrentham Academy. He was graduated from Harvard College in 1774. He studied theology under a private instructor at Woodstock, Connecticut. He also studied law.

Wheaton was admitted to the bar in 1788 and commenced practice in Milton, Massachusetts.

Member of the Massachusetts House of Representatives
Wheaton served as member of the Massachusetts House of Representatives in 1803-1808, and again in 1825.

Judicial career
Wheaton served as judge of the Bristol County Court.
He was appointed chief justice of the court of common pleas of Bristol County May 18, 1810, which position he held until appointed chief justice of the court of sessions for Bristol County on May 25, 1819, but this court was abolished in 1820.

Election to congress

Wheaton was elected as a Federalist to the Eleventh and to the three succeeding Congresses (March 4, 1809 – March 3, 1817).

In 1834 Wheaton established the Wheaton Female Seminary (now Wheaton College in Norton, Massachusetts) as a memorial to his recently deceased daughter, Eliza Wheaton Strong.

Death and burial
Wheaton died in Norton, Massachusetts, on March 23, 1846, at the age of 92. He was interred in Norton Cemetery.

References

Notes

 

1754 births
1846 deaths
Harvard College alumni
Members of the Massachusetts House of Representatives
People from Mansfield, Massachusetts
People from Milton, Massachusetts
People from Norton, Massachusetts
Federalist Party members of the United States House of Representatives from Massachusetts
Wheaton College (Massachusetts) people